Mongolia first participated at the Olympic Games in 1964, and has sent athletes to compete in all but one Summer Olympic Games since then, being part of the boycott of the 1984 Summer Olympics led by the Soviet Union.
Mongolia has also participated in the Winter Olympic Games since 1964, missing only the 1976 Winter Games.

Mongolian athletes have won a total of 30 medals, all in Summer Olympics competitions, in freestyle wrestling, boxing, shooting, and judo. Prior to the 2008 Summer Olympics, Mongolia had won more silver and bronze medals without winning any gold medals than any other nation. Mongolia won their first ever gold medal in Judo, with Naidangiin Tüvshinbayar winning in the Men's half heavyweight. The first successful international-level athlete from Mongolia is the wrestler Jigjidiin Mönkhbat, his records: in 1967 he won a bronze medal at the world championships, next year he won a silver medal at the Summer Olympics (win - 4, draw - 2, loss - 0).

The Mongolian National Olympic Committee was created in 1956 and recognized by the International Olympic Committee in 1962.

Medals

Medals by Summer Games

Medals by Winter Games

Medals by sport

List of medalists

See also
 List of Mongolians
 List of flag bearers for Mongolia at the Olympics
 Mongolia at the Asian Games
 Mongolia at the Paralympics

References

External links
 
 
 
 
 Medalspercapita.com

 
Olympics